Serebrennikovo is a rural locality (a selo) in Borovsky Selsoviet, Aleysky District, Altai Krai, Russia. The population was 52 as of 2013. There are 3 streets.

Geography 
Serebrennikovo is located on the Serebrennikovskoye Lake, 62 km northwest of Aleysk (the district's administrative centre) by road. Voronikha is the nearest rural locality.

References 

Rural localities in Aleysky District